Gregory Wade Harris (born December 1, 1963), is an American former professional baseball player who pitched in the Major Leagues from 1988 through 1995.

Greg Harris was drafted by the San Diego Padres out of Elon University in the 10th round of the 1985 amateur draft. Harris threw a no-hitter while playing for the Wichita Pilots, the AA affiliate of the Padres in 1987, and was named the organization's Minor League Pitcher of the Year. Primarily a relief pitcher in his early days with the Padres, he transitioned back into the starting rotation in 1991. His go-to pitch was a big, sweeping curveball, the best in the National League at the time. His career 2.95 ERA with the Padres is still one of the best ERAs in team history, only surpassed by Trevor Hoffman.

Harris and fellow pitcher Bruce Hurst were shipped off to the Colorado Rockies during the Padres 1993 fire sale, and later finished his career in Minnesota.

Harris' post-career San Diego superior court cases detailed scams and conspiracies that led to financial mismanagement and botched surgeries on his pitching arm and shoulder. The first case, against his surgeon, ended in 1999 with a $6 million verdict in Harris' favor.

During his career, Harris was often known as Greg W. Harris to differentiate him from fellow pitcher Greg A. Harris, whose career (1981–1995) entirely overlapped his.

Pitching stats 
 243 Games
 45 Wins
 64 Losses
 16 Saves
 605 Strikeouts
 3.98 ERA

References

External links

1963 births
Living people
San Diego Padres players
Colorado Rockies players
Minnesota Twins players
Baseball players from North Carolina
Major League Baseball pitchers
Spokane Indians players
Charleston Rainbows players
Wichita Pilots players
Las Vegas Stars (baseball) players
High Desert Mavericks players
Fort Myers Miracle players
Rancho Cucamonga Quakes players